Karma Thinley is a Bhutanese politician who has been a member of the National Assembly of Bhutan, since October 2018.

Education
He holds a Master's degree in Educational Leadership and Management from St. Francis Xavier University, Canada.

Political career
Before joining politics, he was a teacher.

He was elected to the National Assembly of Bhutan as a candidate of DPT from Wamrong constituency in 2018 Bhutanese National Assembly election. He received 2980 votes and defeated Jigme Wangdi, a candidate of DNT.

References 

1973 births
Living people
Bhutanese MNAs 2018–2023
Druk Phuensum Tshogpa politicians
St. Francis Xavier University alumni
Burmese educators
Druk Phuensum Tshogpa MNAs